Robert Carmona-Borjas is a Venezuelan-American lawyer, academic and writer. He is on the faculty of American University in Washington DC and has taught at George Washington University. He is known for addressing the issue of governability, the defense of human rights, democracy and the fight against corruption. As well as publishing several books, he is a columnist for several newspapers including El Nuevo Herald (Miami), El Heraldo (Honduras), El Universal (Venezuela), La Prensa (Nicaragua), Tiempo Latino (Washington) and the TV network Globovision (Venezuela).

After the April 2002 events, in which Carmona-Borjas he acted to draft the decree that reinstated the powers of the state illegally dissolved by Pedro Carmona Estanga, Carmona-Borjas sought political asylum in the United States. He founded the anti-corruption NGO Arcadia Foundation together with Ugandan human rights activist Betty Oyella Bigombe.

Career
Carmona-Borjas taught at the Simon Bolivar University in Venezuela. He is known for addressing the issue of governability, the defense of human rights, democracy and the fight against corruption.

He is the co-founder of the Arcadia Foundation, an anti-corruption foundation aiming to promote the values of rule of law and democracy in politically tumultuous regions of the world. The organization has worked in Honduras, Colombia, Venezuela, Uganda and the United States. Arcadia has recently allocated focus to the corruption occurring within Honduras' Hondutel, and pressed for criminal charges.
He has uncovered Marcelo Chimirri's activities.

Books
Cuba: asedios, utopias y otros bloqueos (Vestigios, Mexico, 1994) [Cuba: Sieges, Utopias and Other Blockades], 
Mas Alla; de la Genesis del 11 de Abril (Alexandria Library, April 2009) [Beyond the Genesis of April 11] ,

References

External links
 Personal website
  Robert Carmona-Borjas' El Universal articles 

Living people
Venezuelan journalists
21st-century Venezuelan lawyers
Academic staff of Simón Bolívar University (Venezuela)
Year of birth missing (living people)